Lagoa (Portuguese for lagoon) may refer to the following:

People
Barbara Lagoa, Cuban-American federal judge

Places

Brazil
Campina da Lagoa, Paraná 
Lagoa, Paraíba, Paraíba
Lagoa, Rio de Janeiro, a quarter of Rio de Janeiro
Lagoa Alegre, Piauí
Lagoa d'Anta, Rio Grande do Norte
Lagoa do Barro do Piauí, Piauí
Lagoa da Canoa, Alagoas
Lagoa do Carro, Pernambuco
Lagoa da Conceição, in the city of Florianópolis, Santa Catarina state
Lagoa da Confusão, Tocantins 
Lagoa de Dentro, Paraíba
Lagoa Dourada, Minas Gerais
Lagoa Formosa, Minas Gerais
Lagoa dos Gatos, Pernambuco
Lagoa Grande, Minas Gerais
Lagoa Grande, Pernambuco
Lagoa Grande do Maranhão, Maranhão
Lagoa do Itaenga, Pernambuco
Manguaba Lagoon, Alagoas
Lagoa do Mato, Maranhão
Lagoa do Mato, Ceará
Lagoa Mirim, Rio Grande do Sul
Mundaú Lagoon, Alagoas
Lagoa Nova, Rio Grande do Norte
Lagoa do Ouro, Pernambuco
Lagoa dos Patos, Rio Grande do Sul
Lagoa de Pedras, Rio Grande do Norte
Lagoa do Piauí, Piauí
Lagoa da Prata, Minas Gerais
Lagoa Real, Bahia
Lagoa Salgada, Rio Grande do Norte
Lagoa Santa, Goiás
Lagoa Santa, Minas Gerais
Lagoa de São Francisco, Piauí
Lagoa Seca, Paraíba
Lagoa do Sítio, Piauí
Lagoa do Tocantins, Tocantins
Lagoa dos Três Cantos, Rio Grande do Sul
Lagoa de Velhos, Rio Grande do Norte
Lagoa Vermelha, Rio Grande do Sul
São João da Lagoa, Minas Gerais
São José da Lagoa Tapada, Paraíba
São Sebastião de Lagoa de Roça, Paraíba
Sete Lagoas, Minas Gerais
Três Lagoas, Mato Grosso do Sul

Cape Verde
Lagoa, Cape Verde, a settlement on the island of Maio

Indonesia
Lagoa (North Jakarta), a village in Koja subdistrict

Portugal
Lagoa, Algarve, a municipality in the Algarve
Lagoa e Carvoeiro, a civil parish in the municipality of Lagoa, Algarve  
 Lagoa de Óbidos, a lagoon in the municipalities of Óbidos and Caldas da Rainha
Lagoa Beach, a beach in the municipality of Póvoa de Varzim

Azores
Lagoa (Azores), a municipality on the island of São Miguel
Lagoa do Fogo, a crater lake, on the island of São Miguel
Surnames of Brazilian origin
Surnames of Portuguese origin
Portuguese-language surnames
Portuguese toponymic surnames